This is a list of museums in Yerevan, the capital city of Armenia.

History, archaeology

History Museum of Armenia (1920)
Yerevan History Museum (1931)
Armenian Genocide Museum-Institute (1967)
Erebuni Museum (1968)
Mother Armenia Military Museum (1970)
Museum of Police History of Armenia (1977)
ARF History Museum (2007)
Central Bank Museum and history of money (2011)

Art, literature

National Gallery of Armenia (1921)
Charents Museum of Literature and Arts (1921)
Hovhannes Tumanyan Museum (1953)
Mesrop Mashtots Museum-Institute of Ancient Manuscripts (1959)
Children's Art Museum (1970)
Modern Art Museum of Yerevan (1972)
Museum of Woodcarving of Armenia (1977)
Hovhannes Sharambeyan Folk Art Museum (1978)
Yervand Kochar Museum (1984)
Museum of Russian Art (1984)
Sergei Parajanov Museum (1988)
Near East Art Museum (1993)
National Museum-Institute of Architecture named after Alexander Tamanian (2002)
Armenian State Pedagogical University Museum (2004)
Cafesjian Center for the Arts (2009)
Komitas Museum (2015)
Museum of Printing (2017)
Hrant Matevossian Museum (2018)
Crochet Museum

House-museum, biography

House-Museum of Khachatur Abovian (1939)
House-Museum of Hovhannes Tumanyan (1953)
House-Museum of Alexander Spendiaryan (1963)
House-Museum of Avetik Isahakyan (1963)
House-Museum of Yeghishe Charents (1964)
House-Museum of Martiros Saryan (1967)
House-Museum of Ara Sargsyan and Hakob Kojoyan (1973)
House-Museum of Derenik Demirchian (1977)
Gevorg Grigoryan (Jotto) Museum (1977)
House-Museum of Aram Khachaturian (1978)
Karen Demirchyan Museum (2001)
House-Museum of Silva Kaputikyan (2003)
General Andranik Museum of Patriotic Movement (2006)
House-Museum of Koryun Nikoghosyan (2009)
Garegin Nzhdeh Museum (2009)
Galentz Museum (2010)
Charles Aznavour Museum (2011)
Fridtjof Nansen Museum (2014)

Nature, geology
Museum of Zoology of Yerevan (1920)
Hovhannes Karapetyan Geological Museum (1937)
State Museum of Nature of Armenia (1952)

Technology, science

Medicine History Museum of Armenia (1978)
Museum of Armenian Medicine (1999)
Space Museum of Yerevan (2001)
Museum of Science and Technology of Yerevan (2008)
Railway Museum of Armenia (2009)
Museum of Communications of Yerevan (2012)
Little Einstein Interactive Science Museum (2016)

References

 
Yerevan
Yerevan
Museums
Museums
Museums